Xunqueira de Espadanedo is a municipality in Ourense (province) in the Galicia region of north-west Spain.

Parroquias (Poblacións) 
 Niñodaguia
 Xunqueira de Espadanedo

References  

Municipalities in the Province of Ourense